Arthur Cope may refer to:

 Arthur C. Cope (1909–1966), organic chemist
 Arthur Stockdale Cope (1857–1940), English portrait painter